Danish Defence agreement 2005–2009 is the white paper for the military of Denmark was signed June 10, 2004.

It calls for a significant reconstruction of the entire Danish military. At present, it is about 60% support structure and 40% combat operational capability, in the future, it will be 40% support structure and 60% combat operational capability, resulting in more combat soldiers and fewer 'paper'-soldiers. The reaction speed will be increased, with an entire brigade on standby readiness for global deployment; the military will retain the capability to deploy 2.000 soldiers in international service, or 5.000 for a short time span. The standard mandatory conscription is modified. Generally this means fewer conscripts, shorter service time for them and only those who choose to will continue into the reaction force system.

Highlights

Army
 Two new brigades will be created of about 4000 men each. One of very high standby readiness, one on lower readiness.
 Hærens Basis Uddannelse "HBU" (Army basic training) will be conducted only in Aalborg, Skive, Holstebro, Fredericia, Varde, Slagelse, Høvelte and Vordingborg barracks.
 Jægerkorpset will be increased to 135 men.
 Prinsens Livregiment will move to Holstebro barracks and amalgamate with Jydske Dragonregiment
 The Army’s M270 MLRS rocket artillery will be disbanded.
 180 Leopard tank's 1A5DK is to be phased out, plus a number of M113 infantry vehicles.
 Sjælsmark barracks will be sold and parts of Kongens Artilleriregiment moved to Varde barracks.

Airforce
 Airbase Værløse will close.
 Number of F16 fighters on NATO standby reduced from 12+12 to 8+8.
 Four transport helicopters are signed up to NATO standby.
 Number of F16 Fighters reduced from 60 to 48.
 The ground–to-air defence DeHAwk disbanded.
 Four additional large transport helicopters are acquired (marine versions), plus another Hercules airplane.

Navy
 One Frigate (with helicopter) and one Patrol ship signed up to NATO standby.
 Frømandskorpset increased to 90 men.
 Navy basic training moved from Auderød to Frederikshavn.
 A navy Sergeant school will be erected in Frederikshavn.
 The navy’s entire submarine capability will be disbanded and also four of the fourteen Standard Flex 300 ships and some additional ships.
 Three new ships are added.

References

External links
 
 

Defence agreement
21st century in Denmark
White papers